Eurypelmella is a nomen dubium (doubtful name) for a genus of spiders in the family Theraphosidae. It has been regarded as a synonym for Schizopelma, but this was disputed in 2016.

References

Theraphosidae
Historically recognized spider taxa
Nomina dubia